The British Caving Association (BCA) is the sports governing body for caving in the United Kingdom. It is recognised by UK Sport, Sport England and SportScotland.

History 

The British Speleological Association (BSA) was founded in 1935, but this was not a national governing body. The National Caving Association (NCA) was established in 1968 as the first governing body, recognised by the Sports Council. However, the British Cave Research Association, the successor to the BSA, continued perform some 'national body' functions after its formation in 1973.

The NCA existed until 2005 when it passed its responsibilities to the British Caving Association, which had been established the prior year. At the same time, the BCA also took over 'national body' functions from the British Cave Research Association.

Structure 
The membership of the BCA  is composed of Constituent Bodies, Regional Councils, clubs and individuals.

The Constituent Bodies are:

 Association of Caving Instructors (ACI)
 Association of Scout Caving Teams (ASCT)
British Cave Research Association (BCRA)
British Cave Rescue Council (BCRC)
Cave Diving Group (CDG)
 Council of Higher Education Caving Clubs (CHECC)
 National Association of Mining History Organisations (NAMHO)
 William Pengelly Cave Studies Trust (WPCST)

The Regional Councils are:

Cambrian Caving Council - responsible for Wales, The Marches and The Royal Forest of Dean.
Council of Northern Caving Clubs - responsible for the north of Britain.
Council of Southern Caving Clubs - responsible for the Mendip Hills, West Wiltshire and The Isle of Portland.
Derbyshire Caving Association - responsible for  the Peak District, South Yorkshire, North Notts and Cheshire.
Devon & Cornwall Underground Council - responsible for Devon & Cornwall.

See also
 Caving in the United Kingdom
 List of cave rescue organizations § United Kingdom

References

External links 
 British Caving Association
Constituent Bodies
 Association of Caving Instructors
 Association of Scout Caving Teams
 British Cave Research Association
 British Cave Rescue Council
 Cave Diving Group of Great Britain & Northern Ireland
 Council of Higher Education Caving Clubs
 National Association of Mining History Organisations
 The William Pengelly Cave Studies Trust
Regional Councils
 Cambrian Caving Council
 Council of Northern Caving Clubs
 Council Of Southern Caving Clubs
 Derbyshire Caving Association
 Devon & Cornwall Underground Council

Caving organisations in the United Kingdom
Derbyshire Dales
Organisations based in Derbyshire
Caving
Sport in Derbyshire